Aspilapteryx multipunctella is a moth of the family Gracillariidae. It is known from Spain and the Canary Islands.

The larvae feed on Plantago albicans and Plantago arborescens. They mine the leaves of their host plant. Young larvae spins two to three leaves together, and mine these out completely. Older larvae live freely in the centre of a bundle of leaves of the tip of a shoot. The frass is deposited on the bottom of this enclosed space. Pupation takes place in a cocoon with a tube like prolongation that extends up to a circular opening, closed with silk, that will permit the escape of the imago.

References

Aspilapteryx
Moths of Europe
Moths described in 1917